Nandalur is a village in Annamayya district of the Indian state of Andhra Pradesh. It is located in Nandalur mandal of Rajampeta revenue division. 
It is 10 km from Rajampet and 42 km from the District headquarters of the Cuddapah district on the State Highway connecting Cuddapah with Tirupati.  It is located on the Cuddapah-Chennai highway, 38 km from Cuddapah and 11 km from Rajampeta. It is also close to other pilgrimage centres in Cuddapah district like Ontimitta, Polatala, Attirala and the famed birthplace of Sri Annamacharya, Tallapaka. It has an average elevation of 151 meters (498 feet).

Nandalur is on the west bank of river Cheyyeru. Once it was a famous Buddhist centre in Rayalaseema. In 1913 Buddhist caves and viharas were discovered.

Sri Soumyanatha Swamy temple, here is a very big temple, situated nearly on ten acres of site. It is a replica of Thiruvannamalai Arunachalesvara Temple and 
patronized by Cholas, Pandyas, Kakatiyas, Vijayanagara, Pottapi and Matli Kings. Here most of the inscriptions, are in Tamil. 
Lord Sowmyanatha is installed on an elevated place and attracts pilgrims with his glittering beauty.

The temple and Buddhist caves are worth seeing at this town and is well connected by road and rail.

Geography and climate

Gallery

References

External links 

Villages in Kadapa district